The 2018 IAAF World Challenge was the ninth edition of the annual, global circuit of one-day track and field competitions organized by the International Association of Athletics Federations (IAAF). The series featured a total of nine meetings, with the meetings remaining unchanged from the previous year. The host venue of the Brazilian leg of the series moved from São Bernardo do Campo to Bragança Paulista.

Schedule

References

External links
Official website

2018
World Challenge Meetings